Loxodontomys is a genus of South American rodents in the tribe Phyllotini of family Cricetidae. Two species are known, found in Argentina and Chile. They are as follows:
 Southern big-eared mouse (Loxodontomys micropus)
 Pikumche pericote (Loxodontomys pikumche)

References 

 
Rodent genera